"Touch A Four Leaf Clover" is a song recorded by R&B group Atlantic Starr, released as a single from their 1983 Yours Forever by A&M Records. The song reached No. 4 on the US Billboard Hot R&B Singles chart.

Overview
"Touch a Four Leaf Clover" was produced by James Anthony Carmichael and composed by David Lewis with Wayne Lewis.

Charts

Weekly charts

Year-end charts

Covers
Erykah Badu covered "Touch a Four Leaf Clover" for her 1997 album Baduizm.

References

1983 singles
1983 songs
Atlantic Starr songs
A&M Records singles
Song recordings produced by James Anthony Carmichael